Laporte is a provincial electoral district in the Montérégie region of Quebec, Canada that elects members to the National Assembly of Quebec.

It was created for the 1973 election from parts of Taillon and Chambly.

It was named after former Liberal Minister Pierre Laporte who was kidnapped and killed by militants of the Front de libération du Québec during the October Crisis in 1970.

In the change from the 2011 to the 2017 electoral map, it will gain the area around the Champlain Mall from the riding of La Pinière.

Geography
The riding currently includes:
The entire City of Saint-Lambert
 The following areas of the City of Longueuil:
Borough of Greenfield Park,
LeMoyne district of the Borough of Le Vieux-Longueuil,
Laflèche district of the Borough of Saint-Hubert
 The north-west areas of Brossard
In the change from the 2001 to the 2011 electoral map, its territory was unchanged.

Members of the National Assembly
This riding has elected the following Members of the National Assembly:

Election results

* Result compared to Action démocratique

* Result compared to UFP

|Liberal
|Michel Audet
|align="right"|18,673
|align="right"|55.22
|align="right"|+2.37

References

External links
Information
 Elections Quebec

Election results
 Election results (National Assembly)
 Election results (QuébecPolitique)

Maps
 2011 map (PDF)
 2001 map (Flash)
2001–2011 changes (Flash)
1992–2001 changes (Flash)
 Electoral map of Montérégie region
 Quebec electoral map, 2011

Politics of Longueuil
Quebec provincial electoral districts
Saint-Lambert, Quebec